DZMD (1161 AM) was a radio station owned and operated by PBN Broadcasting Network. Its studios and transmitter were located at #2450 Vinsons Ave., Daet.

References

Radio stations established in 1970
Radio stations in Camarines Norte